This is intended to be a complete list of properties and districts listed on the National Register of Historic Places in Orleans County, New York. The locations of National Register properties and districts (at least for all showing latitude and longitude coordinates below) may be seen in a map by clicking on "Map of all coordinates".  Two listings, the New York State Barge Canal and the Cobblestone Historic District, are further designated a National Historic Landmark.

There are currently 29 listings in the county, the fourth fewest in the state after Schuyler County (19), Hamilton County (22) and Genesee County (23). Seven of the listings are historic districts, including Mount Albion Cemetery (Millville Cemetery is classified as a site). The remaining 20 are individual buildings. No structures in the county are yet listed on the National Register.

Overview

Of the 20 buildings, at least 10 have been used as dwellings at some point in their history. Two of those were originally inns that have since become residences. The Tousley-Church House was later converted into the local Daughters of the American Revolution chapter offices. The four conventional historic districts all include some residential properties as well among their contributing properties.

Three other buildings—the Albion and Medina post offices and the Medina Armory—are government buildings. The armory is now used by the local YMCA. No commercial buildings in Orleans County are individually listed on the Register. Nor are any religious buildings, although seven churches contribute to the Orleans County Courthouse Historic District and one to the Cobblestone Historic District. No educational buildings were listed on their own until 2017, when the Gaines District No. 2 Cobblestone Schoolhouse was listed; however, the Cobblestone Historic District includes an old one-room schoolhouse among its contributing properties.

The Cobblestone Historic District, with three buildings on two discontiguous plots totaling three-quarters of an acre (3,000 m2), is the smallest district and the smallest National Historic Landmark District in New York.

The other three districts are in the downtowns of Medina and Albion, the largest settlements in the county. The two Albion districts abut each other, with the southerly being characterized by the public buildings, churches and residences around the county courthouse while the northerly is primarily commercial. Medina's Main Street Historic District is almost all commercial property.

All but three of the buildings (and one structure) within the historic districts are considered contributing properties. None of the contributing properties are themselves listed individually on the Register. However, the Albion post office, within the bounds of the county courthouse historic district, is not considered a contributing property to it despite later being listed on the Register, since it was built two decades after the district's period of significance.

Listings county-wide

|}

See also

National Register of Historic Places listings in New York

Notes

References

External links
Orleans County National Register listings at nationalregisterofhistoricplaces.com

Orleans County
Orleans County, New York